Logan is the name of a cyclecar that was built in 1914 only, by the Northwestern Motorcycle Works in Chicago, Illinois.

History 
Power came from an air-cooled engine with two cylinders made by Spacke, delivering . It had friction transmission and belt drive. It was available with a metal roadster body seating two persons side-by side although it had a tread of only . Priced at $375, production was minimal.

References

Defunct motor vehicle manufacturers of the United States
Defunct companies based in Illinois
Cyclecars
Motor vehicle manufacturers based in Illinois

1910s cars
Brass Era vehicles
Cars introduced in 1914
Vehicle manufacturing companies established in 1914
Vehicle manufacturing companies disestablished in 1914